Pejačević Manor is located in the Virovitica , which nowadays forms a part of the city centre of the city of Virovitica . 
It is one of several castles owned by the members of Pejačević noble family in the croatian region of Slavonia.

History

According to the sign located on the facade above the entrance, the manor was built by count Antun Pejačević in 1804, with the actual construction beginning in 1800.

The Virovitica Estate was acquired by the Pejačević Counts as a grant by the then Austrian Empress and Croatian-Hungarian Queen Maria Theresa in 1750. In the beginning it started out as a relatively small estate.

Architecture

The refined classical manor is composed of three wings shaped in the straight form. The internal space is organised around a central hallway with rooms aligned on either side. The central axis is highlighted by the grand hall and central dome.

See also

 House of Pejačević
 List of castles in Croatia
 Museum

References

External links 
 Castle dominating the center of the Town of Virovitica
 History of the Pejačević Castle
 History of the Castle and Virovitica Municipal Museum
 Virovitica Municipal Museum and its collections

Castles in Croatia
Museums in Croatia
History of Slavonia
Buildings and structures in Virovitica-Podravina County
Virovitica castle
Tourist attractions in Virovitica-Podravina County